Devoney Kay Looser (born April 11, 1967) is an American literary critic and Jane Austen scholar. She is Regents Professor of English at Arizona State University, where she focuses on women's writing and the history of the novel.

Early life and education
Looser was born in Saint Paul, Minnesota on April 11, 1967, and raised in White Bear Lake, Minnesota, where her mother first introduced her to Jane Austen's work. Looser attended and graduated from Hill-Murray School in Maplewood, Minnesota in 1985.

As a first-generation college student, Looser received a Bachelor of Arts in English from Augsburg College in 1989 and later earned her doctorate in English with a certification in women's studies from Stony Brook University.

Career
After teaching at Indiana State University, University of Wisconsin-Whitewater, Louisiana State University, and the University of Missouri, Looser accepted a faculty appointment at Arizona State University in 2013.

In 2018, Looser was appointed a Foundation Professor of English for her outstanding faculty accomplishments. In 2020, she was named a Regents Professor, the highest faculty honor awarded at Arizona State University.

She has played roller derby as Stone Cold Jane Austen.

Books and essays

Looser's book Sister Novelists: The Trailblazing Porter Sisters Who Paved the Way for Austen and the Brontës is the first biography of Jane and Anna Maria Porter, pioneers of historical fiction.

She is also the author of The Making of Jane Austen, which focused on how Austen's popular influencers shaped her reputation, including as "a transnational figure used in support of women's suffrage." Publishers Weekly named The Making of Jane Austen a Best Summer Book (Non-Fiction).

Her first book was British Women Writers and the Writing of History, 1670–1820, which examined British women writers and their contributions to historiography. She followed this up with Women Writers and Old Age in Great Britain, 1750–1850 in 2008.

Looser's essays and op-eds have appeared in The New York Times, The Washington Post, The Atlantic, Salon, Slate, and The TLS. In 2019, Looser brought back into view a forgotten fictional pen portrait of Austen published in an 1823 issue of The Lady's Magazine. In 2021, she published discoveries about the Austen family's complicated relationship to slavery and anti-slavery, which revealed the previously unknown fact that Jane Austen's brother, Henry Thomas Austen, had been a delegate to an Anti-Slavery Convention.
 She has done lectures on Jane Austen for The Great Courses

Recognition 
In 2018, Looser was awarded a Guggenheim Fellowship and a National Endowment for the Humanities Public Scholar award to research the sisters Jane and Anna Maria Porter.

References

Bibliography
 
 
 
 
 *

External links
 
 CV
 Personal website

Living people
Jane Austen scholars
People from White Bear Lake, Minnesota
Arizona State University faculty
Louisiana State University faculty
University of Missouri faculty
Stony Brook University alumni
Augsburg University alumni
1967 births
Women academics
Women biographers